The PO postcode area, also known as the Portsmouth postcode area, is a group of 34 postcode districts in southern England, within 24 post towns. These cover south-east Hampshire (including Portsmouth, Southsea, Havant, Waterlooville, Lee-on-the-Solent, Gosport, Fareham, Rowland's Castle, Emsworth and Hayling Island), southwestern West Sussex (including Chichester and Bognor Regis) and the Isle of Wight.



Coverage
The approximate coverage of the postcode districts:

|-
! PO1
| PORTSMOUTH
| Old Portsmouth, Portsea, HMNB Portsmouth, Landport, Buckland, Fratton, Kingston
| Portsmouth
|-
! PO2
| PORTSMOUTH
| Kingston, Rudmore, Whale Island, North End, Stamshaw, Tipner, Hilsea
| Portsmouth
|-
! PO3
| PORTSMOUTH
| Hilsea (including Anchorage Park), Copnor, Baffins
| Portsmouth
|-
! PO4
| SOUTHSEA
| Milton, Eastney, Southsea, Horse Sand Fort 
| Portsmouth
|-
! PO5
| SOUTHSEA
| Southsea, Somerstown, Spitbank Fort
| Portsmouth
|-
! PO6
| PORTSMOUTH
| Farlington, Drayton, Cosham, Wymering, Paulsgrove, Port Solent
| Portsmouth
|-
! PO7
| WATERLOOVILLE
| Waterlooville, Denmead, Purbrook
| Havant, Winchester
|-
! PO8
| WATERLOOVILLE
| Clanfield, Cowplain, Horndean
| East Hampshire, Havant
|-
!rowspan=2|PO9
| HAVANT
| Havant
| Havant
|-
| ROWLAND'S CASTLE
| Rowland's Castle
| East Hampshire, Havant
|-
! PO10
| EMSWORTH
| Emsworth, Southbourne, Westbourne
| Chichester, Havant
|-
! PO11
| HAYLING ISLAND
| Hayling Island
| Havant
|-
! PO12
| GOSPORT
| Gosport, Alverstoke, Hardway
| Gosport
|-
!rowspan=2|PO13
| GOSPORT
| Gosport
| Gosport
|-
| LEE-ON-THE-SOLENT
| Lee-on-the-Solent
| Gosport
|-
! PO14
| FAREHAM
| Fareham, Hill Head, Stubbington, Titchfield
| Fareham
|-
! PO15
| FAREHAM
| Fareham, Titchfield, Whiteley
| Fareham
|-
! PO16
| FAREHAM
| Portchester
| Fareham
|-
! PO17
| FAREHAM
| Wickham
| Fareham
|-
! PO18
| CHICHESTER
| Bosham, Boxgrove, Eartham, East Dean, Goodwood, Funtington, Nutbourne
| Chichester
|-
! PO19
| CHICHESTER
| Chichester, Fishbourne
| Chichester
|-
! PO20
| CHICHESTER
| Selsey, West Wittering, East Wittering, Tangmere, Oving, Westergate, Eastergate
| Arun, Chichester
|-
! PO21
| BOGNOR REGIS
| Bognor Regis, Aldwick, Pagham
| Arun
|-
! PO22
| BOGNOR REGIS
| Bognor Regis, Barnham, Elmer, Felpham, Middleton-on-Sea
| Arun
|-
! style="background:#FFFFFF;"|PO24
| style="background:#FFFFFF;"|PORTSMOUTH
| style="background:#FFFFFF;"|Census 2021 (its main national office)
| style="background:#FFFFFF;"|non-geographic
|-
! PO30
| NEWPORT
| Newport
| Isle of Wight
|-
! PO31
| COWES
| Cowes, Gurnard
| Isle of Wight
|-
! PO32
| EAST COWES
| East Cowes, Whippingham
| Isle of Wight
|-
! PO33
| RYDE
| Ryde, St Helens Fort
| Isle of Wight
|-
! PO34
| SEAVIEW
| Seaview, No Man's Land Fort
| Isle of Wight
|-
! PO35
| BEMBRIDGE
| Bembridge, Whitecliff Bay
| Isle of Wight
|-
! PO36
| SANDOWN
| Sandown
| Isle of Wight
|-
! PO37
| SHANKLIN
| Shanklin
| Isle of Wight
|-
! PO38
| VENTNOR
| Ventnor
| Isle of Wight
|-
! PO39
| TOTLAND BAY
| Totland Bay, Alum Bay
| Isle of Wight
|-
! PO40
| FRESHWATER
| Freshwater
| Isle of Wight
|-
! PO41
| YARMOUTH
| Yarmouth
| Isle of Wight
|}

Map

See also
Postcode Address File
List of postcode areas in the United Kingdom

References

External links
Royal Mail's Postcode Address File
A quick introduction to Royal Mail's Postcode Address File (PAF)

Postcode areas covering South East England